Lunderskov is a railway town, with a population of 3,016 (1 January 2022), in Kolding Municipality, Region of Southern Denmark in Denmark. It is situated 13 km west of Kolding, 8 km north of Vamdrup and 12 km east of Vejen. 

Lunderskov was the municipal seat of the former Lunderskov Municipality until 1 January 2007.

Drabæks Mølle is a former watermill located in the northern part of Lunderskov. Drabæks Mølle is the oldest business, driven under the same name since ca. 1100. It was closed in 2008 and is now a private recidential property.

Transportation

Lunderskov is a railway junction located where the Lunderskov-Esbjerg railway line is connected with the Fredericia-Padborg line. It is served  by Lunderskov station.

Gallery

References

External links

 Weather forecast Lunderskov, Denmark weather-map.com

Cities and towns in the Region of Southern Denmark
Kolding Municipality